The KPXM Tower (formerly KXLI Tower) is the tallest structure in Minnesota, a guyed aerial mast rising 1505 feet (458.72 meters).  It formerly transmitted the signal for KPXM-TV (virtual channel 41 (40 digital), which is an Ion Television network affiliate licensed to serve St. Cloud, Minnesota.  The tower is located about halfway between St. Cloud and the core of the Minneapolis–Saint Paul area, near the city of Big Lake.

The tower was completed in 1982 and is the property of American Tower.  KXLI was the call sign of channel 41, which signed on the air the day before Thanksgiving of 1982, when the tower was built.  It surpassed the height of the KMSP Tower, completed in 1971.

The tallest non-guyed structures in the state are the IDS Tower (792 ft/241.4 m or 910 ft/277.3 m with rooftop antennas) and the Capella Tower (776 ft/236.5 m) in Minneapolis.

See also
List of masts

External links
 
 

Towers in Minnesota
Radio masts and towers in the United States
Towers completed in 1997
1997 establishments in Minnesota
Buildings and structures in Sherburne County, Minnesota